Dissing may refer to:

Diss (music), song primarily intended to disrespect people
Dissing+Weitling, architecture and design practice in Copenhagen, Denmark
Heino Dissing (1912–1990), Danish cyclist
Henry Dissing (1931–2009), Danish mycologist 
Povl Dissing (born 1938), Danish singer